Sioux City is a line of soft drinks manufactured and marketed by White Rock Beverages. Introduced in 1987, the product is generally sold in embossed glass bottles, although it is also available in cans.

Sioux City "saloon style" soft drinks are available in a variety of flavors, including:

Sarsaparilla – promoted on the label as "The Granddaddy of all Root Beers"
Diet Sarsaparilla
Root Beer
Birch Beer
Ginger Beer
Cream Soda
Black Cherry
Orange Cream
Prickly Pear
Berry Berry – a mixture of blueberry and raspberry flavors
Cherries 'n Mint

Cultural references
"Sioux City Sarsaparilla" is a song by Children of Bodom's Alexi Laiho from the Finnish Guitar Heroes compilation album.

In the film The Big Lebowski, when the Stranger (Sam Elliott) asks the bowling alley bartender, "You got a good sarsaparilla?", Gary the bartender replies, "Sioux City Sarsaparilla?" to which the Stranger responds, "Yeah, that's a good one."

References

External links
Sioux City soft drinks

Products introduced in 1987
American soft drinks
Soft beers and malt drinks